Gullit may refer to:

 Alex Tamba Brima, also known as Gullit, (born 1971), a military commander of the Sierra Leone Civil War who was convicted of crimes against humanity and war crimes
 Asante Gullit Okyere (born 1988), Italian footballer
 Ruud Gullit (born 1962), Dutch football player and coach
 Maxim Gullit (born 2001), Dutch football player